Firefly is an American space Western drama television series, created by writer and director Joss Whedon, under his Mutant Enemy Productions label. Whedon served as an executive producer, along with Tim Minear. The series is set in the year 2517, after the arrival of humans in a new star system, and follows the adventures of the renegade crew of Serenity, a "Firefly-class" spaceship. The ensemble cast portrays the nine characters who live on Serenity. Whedon pitched the show as "nine people looking into the blackness of space and seeing nine different things."

The show explores the lives of a group of people, some of whom fought on the losing side of a civil war, who make a living on the fringes of society as part of the pioneer culture of their star system. In this future, the only two surviving superpowers, the United States and China, fused to form the central federal government, called the Alliance, resulting in the fusion of the two cultures. According to Whedon's vision, "nothing will change in the future: technology will advance, but we will still have the same political, moral, and ethical problems as today."

Firefly premiered in the U.S. on the Fox network on September 20, 2002. By mid-December, Firefly had averaged 4.7 million viewers per episode and was 98th in Nielsen ratings. It was canceled after 11 of the 14 produced episodes were aired. Despite the relatively short life span of the series, it received strong sales when it was released on DVD and has large fan support campaigns. It won a Primetime Emmy Award in 2003 for Outstanding Special Visual Effects for a Series. TV Guide ranked the series at No. 5 on their 2013 list of 60 shows that were "Cancelled Too Soon".

The post-airing success of the show led Whedon and Universal Pictures to produce Serenity, a 2005 film which continues the story from the series. The Firefly franchise expanded into other media, including comics and a role-playing game.

Premise

Backstory 
The series takes place in the year 2517, on a variety of planets and moons. The TV series does not reveal whether these celestial bodies are within one star system, only saying that Serenitys mode of propulsion is a "gravity-drive". Re-runs start with Book or Captain Reynolds providing the backstory. Book's narration runs as follows:

The film Serenity makes clear that the planets and moons are in an extensive system, and production documents related to the film indicate that there is no faster-than-light travel in this universe. The characters occasionally refer to "Earth-that-was", and the film establishes that long before the events in the series, a large population had emigrated from Earth to a new star system in generation ships: "Earth-that-was could no longer sustain our numbers, we were so many." The emigrants established themselves in this new star system, with "dozens of planets and hundreds of moons", and many of these were terraformed, a process that was only the first step in making a planet habitable. The outlying settlements often did not receive any further support in the construction of their civilizations. This resulted in many border planets and moons having forbidding, dry environments, well-suited to the Western genre.

Synopsis 
The show takes its name from the "Firefly-class" spaceship Serenity that the central characters call home. It resembles a firefly in general arrangement and the tail section, analogous to a bioluminescent insectoid abdomen, lights up during acceleration. The ship was named after the Battle of Serenity Valley, where Sergeant Malcolm Reynolds and Corporal Zoe Alleyne were among the survivors on the losing side. It is revealed in "Bushwhacked" that the Battle of Serenity Valley is widely considered to have sealed the Independents' fate.

The Alliance is shown to govern the star system through an organization of "core" planets, following its success in forcibly unifying all the colonies under one government. DVD commentary suggests that the Alliance is composed of two primary "core" systems, one predominantly Western, the other pan-Asian, justifying the mixed linguistic and visual themes of the series. The central planets are firmly under Alliance control, but the outlying planets and moons resemble the American Old West, under little governmental authority. Settlers and refugees on the outlying worlds have relative freedom from the central government but lack the amenities of the high-tech civilization that exists on the inner worlds. The outlying areas of space ("the black") are inhabited by the Reavers, a cannibalistic group of nomadic humans.

The captain of Serenity is Malcolm "Mal" Reynolds (Nathan Fillion). The episode "Serenity" establishes that the captain and his first mate Zoe Washburne, née Alleyne (Gina Torres) are veteran "Browncoats" of the Unification War, a failed attempt by the outlying worlds to resist the Alliance. A later episode, "Out of Gas", reveals that Mal bought the spaceship Serenity to live beyond Alliance control. Much of the crew's work consists of cargo runs or smuggling. The main story is that of River Tam (Summer Glau) and her brother Simon (Sean Maher). River is a child prodigy whose brain was subjected to Alliance scientists at a secret government institution; she displays symptoms of schizophrenia and often hears voices. It is later revealed that she is a "reader", one who possesses telepathic abilities. Simon gave up a career as an eminent trauma surgeon in an Alliance hospital to rescue her, and they are fugitives. In the original pilot, "Serenity", Simon joins the crew as a paying passenger with River smuggled on board as cargo. As Whedon states in an episode of a DVD commentary, every show he does is about creating a family. By the last episode, "Objects in Space", the fractured character of River has finally become whole, partly because the others decided to accept her into their "family" on the ship.

Signature show elements 
The show blends elements from the space opera and Western genres, depicting humanity's future in a manner different from most contemporary science fiction programs in that there are no large space battles. Firefly takes place in a multi-social future, primarily a fusion of Western and East Asian societies, where there is gross class inequality. As a result of the Sino-American Alliance, Mandarin Chinese is a common second language; it is used in advertisements, and characters in the show frequently curse in Mandarin. According to the DVD commentary on the episode "Serenity", this was explained as the result of China and the United States being the two superpowers that expanded into space.

The show features slang not used in contemporary culture, such as adaptations of modern words or new words. "Shiny" is frequently used as the real world slang "cool", and "gorram" is used as a mild swear word. Written and spoken Chinese, as well as Old West dialect, are also employed. As one reviewer noted: "The dialogue tended to be a bizarre purée of wisecracks, old-timey Western-paperback patois, and snatches of Chinese."

Tim Minear and Joss Whedon pointed out two scenes that, they believed, articulated the show's mood exceptionally clearly. One scene is in the original pilot "Serenity" when Mal is eating with chopsticks, and a Western tin cup is by his plate; the other is in "The Train Job" pilot when Mal is thrown out of a holographic bar window. The DVD set's "making-of" documentary explains the distinctive frontispiece of the series (wherein Serenity soars over a herd of horses) as Whedon's attempt to capture "everything you need to understand about the series in five seconds."

One of the struggles that Whedon had with Fox was the tone of the show, especially with the main character Malcolm Reynolds. Fox pressured Whedon to make Mal more "jolly", as they feared he was too dark in the original pilot, epitomized by the moment he suggests he might "space" Simon and River, throwing them out of the airlock. Fox was not happy that the show involved the "nobodies" who "get squished by policy" instead of the actual policymakers.

Cast

Main 
Firefly maintained an ensemble cast that portrayed nine crew members and passengers of the ship, Serenity. These characters fight criminals and schemers, Alliance security forces, the utterly psychotic and brutal Reavers, and the mysterious men with "hands of blue"—who are operatives of a secret agency which is part of the megacorporation referred to in the DVD commentary only as The Blue Sun Corporation. The crew is driven by the need to secure enough income to keep their ship operational, set against their need to keep a low profile to avoid their adversaries. Their situation is incredibly complicated by the divergent motivations of the individuals on board Serenity, but the show's brief run hampered complex characterization.

All nine of the main characters appeared in every episode, except "Ariel", from which Book is absent.
 Nathan Fillion as Malcolm "Mal" Reynolds – the owner and captain of Serenity and former Independent sergeant in the pivotal Battle of Serenity Valley. Malcolm grew up on a ranch and was raised by his mother and the ranch hands. In the Unification War, he fought as a platoon sergeant in the 57th Overlanders of the Independent Army, the "Browncoats". He is cunning, a capable leader, and a skilled fighter. Mal's primary motivation is his will for independence. While he is not above petty theft, smuggling, or even killing to maintain his free lifestyle, he is generally honest in his dealings with others, fiercely loyal to his crew, and closely follows a personal moral code. He is openly antagonistic toward religion as a result of his war experience.
 Gina Torres as Zoe Alleyne Washburne – second-in-command onboard Serenity, a loyal wartime friend of Captain Reynolds and Wash's wife. Her surname during the Unification War was Alleyne. She was born and raised on a ship and served under Mal during the war as a corporal. Described by her husband as a "warrior woman", she is a capable fighter who keeps calm even in the most dangerous situations. She demonstrates an almost unconditional loyalty to Mal. The only exception noted being her marriage to Wash, which the captain claims was against his orders.
 Alan Tudyk as Hoban "Wash" Washburne – Serenitys pilot and Zoe's husband. Deeply in love with his wife, Wash expresses jealousy over his wife's "war buddy" relationship and unconditional support of their captain, most particularly in the episode "War Stories", in which he confronts Mal, even as a dissatisfied customer is torturing them. He joined pilot training just to see the stars, which were invisible from the surface of his polluted homeworld, and he joined Serenity despite being highly sought after by other ships. He is light-hearted and tends to make amusing comments, despite the severity of any situation.
 Morena Baccarin as Inara Serra – a Companion, which is the 26th century cross between a geisha and a courtesan or mistress, who rents one of Serenitys two small shuttles. Inara enjoys high social standing. Her presence confers a degree of legitimacy and social acceptance the crew of Serenity would not have without her on board. Inara displays great dignity, civility, and compassion. There is strong romantic tension between her and Mal, who share many character traits, but each jokingly objects to the other's work as "whoring" or "petty theft", respectively. Both refuse to act on their feelings and try to keep their relationship professional.
 Adam Baldwin as Jayne Cobb – a mercenary. He and Mal met when they were on opposite sides of a dispute; Mal, while held at gunpoint, offered Jayne his own bunk and a higher cut than his current employer, so Jayne switched sides and shot his then-partners. In the original pilot, "Serenity", he intimates to Mal that he did not betray him because "The money wasn't good enough."  However, previously he had pointedly asked the Alliance agent whether he would be required to turn on the captain to help him. In "Ariel", he defends his actions in alerting the authorities regarding Simon and River by claiming he had not intended to betray Mal. He is someone who can be depended on in a fight. He tends to act like a "lummox" who thinks he is the smartest person in space, but occasional hints of intelligence peek through this façade, giving the impression that he acts dumber than he is. As Whedon states several times, Jayne is the man who will ask the questions that no one else wants to. Even though he is a macho character, he has shown a particularly intense fear of Reavers, more so than the rest of the crew. Despite his amoral mercenary persona, he sends a significant portion of his income to his mother, again suggesting that there is more to his character than what he presents to the rest of the crew.
 Jewel Staite as Kaywinnet Lee "Kaylee" Frye – the ship's mechanic. In the episode "Out of Gas", it is established that she has no formal training, but keeps Serenity running with an intuitive gift for the workings of mechanical equipment. Jewel Staite explains Kaylee's character as being wholesome, sweet, and "completely genuine in that sweetness", adding "She loves being on that ship. She loves all of those people. And she is the only one who loves all of them incredibly genuinely." She has a crush on Simon Tam. Kaylee is the heart of the ship: according to creator Joss Whedon, if Kaylee believes something, it is true.
 Sean Maher as Simon Tam – a trauma surgeon of the first caliber (top 3% in his class at a top core-planet institution), who is on the run after breaking his sister River out of a government research facility. In the episode "Safe", it is revealed that he and River had a privileged upbringing with access to the best education. In rescuing River over his stern father's severe objections, Simon sacrificed a highly successful future in medicine. His bumbling attempts at a romantic relationship with Kaylee are a recurring subplot throughout the series. At every turn, he seems to find a way to foil his attempts at romance unwittingly. His life is defined by caring for his sister.
 Summer Glau as River Tam – smuggled onto the ship by her brother. She is a brilliant, compassionate, and intuitive child prodigy. Experiments and invasive brain surgery at an Alliance secret facility left her delusional, paranoid, and at times violent, though her uncanny ability to seemingly sense things before they happen leaves questions as to where the delusions end and reality begins for her. The experiments seemed to have made her a psychic. The experiments also gave her a seemingly innate ability in hand-to-hand combat, and she is capable of killing or incapacitating several opponents with ease. She gets frequent fits of anxiety and experiences post-traumatic flashbacks of her time in the Alliance facility. Her mental instability and uncanny abilities, paired with several erratic and violent acts, are a recurring source of fear and doubt among the crew, especially with Jayne, whom she once slashed with a knife. Jayne frequently requests that River and Simon be taken off the ship.
 Ron Glass as Derrial Book – a Shepherd (equivalent to a pastor). Although presented as a devout Christian, Book has profound, unexplained knowledge about criminal activities, police corruption, and military strategy, tactics, and weapons. In "Safe", he was shown to have sufficient status in the Alliance to receive emergency medical treatment from an Alliance ship, with no questions asked. He is also proficient in hand-to-hand combat and the use of firearms. While objecting to violence most of the time, on a rescue mission, he joins the fight, stating that while the Bible is quite specific about killing, it is "somewhat fuzzier on the subject of kneecaps". Book is a moral guide for Mal and the rest of the crew, a voice of reason, conscience, and spirituality. At the same time, he seems to get along well with the amoral mercenary Jayne, with the two spotting each other while working out using a bench press. His hidden backstory would have been gradually revealed had the series continued but was instead explored in the 2010 comic book The Shepherd's Tale.

Recurring 
Despite the series' short run, several recurring characters emerged from the inhabitants of the Firefly universe:
 Mark Sheppard as Badger – an established smuggling middleman on the planet Persephone. He provided jobs for Serenity on at least two occasions. In the DVD commentary for the episode "Serenity", it was revealed that this part was initially written with Whedon himself playing the role. Badger appeared in the original pilot "Serenity" and in "Shindig", with a return in the comic book series Serenity: Those Left Behind.
 Michael Fairman as Adelai Niska – a criminal kingpin who has a reputation for violent reprisals, including severe, prolonged torture, against those who fail him or even irritate him. He appeared in "The Train Job" and "War Stories".
 Christina Hendricks as "Saffron" – a con artist whose real name is unknown. She first appeared in the episode "Our Mrs. Reynolds" as Mal's involuntarily acquired wife. She has a habit of marrying her marks during her scams. She returns in the episode "Trash", where Mal jokingly addresses her as "YoSaffBridge", from the three of her aliases known within the show: "Yolanda", "Saffron", and "Bridget".
 Jeff Ricketts and Dennis Cockrum as "The Hands of Blue" – two anonymous men wearing suits and blue gloves who pursue River, apparently to return her to the institute from which she escaped, as shown in "The Train Job", "Ariel", and the Serenity: Those Left Behind comic. They kill anyone, including Alliance personnel, who had contact with her, using a mysterious hand-held device that causes fatal hemorrhaging in anyone at whom it is aimed. River, during anxiety attacks or psychological meltdowns, has repeated the phrase "Two by two/hands of blue" in a way that resembles poetic meter. This suggests that River has had close experience(s) with them.

Episodes

Production

Origin 
Whedon developed the concept for the show after reading The Killer Angels by Michael Shaara chronicling the Battle of Gettysburg during the American Civil War. He wanted to follow people who had fought on the losing side of a war, their experiences afterward as pioneers and immigrants on the outskirts of civilization, much like the post-American Civil War era of Reconstruction and the American Old West. He intended the show to be "a Stagecoach kind of drama with a lot of people trying to figure out their lives in a bleak pioneer environment". Whedon wanted to develop a show about the tactile nature of life, a show where existence was more physical and more difficult. Whedon also read a book about Jewish partisan fighters in World War II. Whedon wanted to create something for television that was more character-driven and gritty than most modern science fiction. Television science fiction, he felt, had become too pristine and rarefied. Whedon wanted to give the show a name that indicated movement and power and felt that "Firefly" had both. This powerful word's relatively insignificant meaning, Whedon felt, added to its allure. He eventually created a ship in the image of a firefly.

Format 
During the pilot episode filming, Whedon was still arguing with Fox that the show should be displayed in widescreen format. Whedon filmed scenes with actors on the edge of both sides so that they could only be shown in widescreen. This led to a few scenes on the DVD (and later Blu-ray) where objects or setups that were not visible in the original 4:3 broadcasts were displayed—such as the scene in the pilot where Wash mimes controlling the ship with a non-existent yoke. The Fox executives rejected the pilot, who felt that it lacked action and that the captain was too "dour". They also disliked a scene in which the crew backed down to a crime boss since the scene implied the crew was "being nothing". Fox told Whedon on a Friday afternoon that he had to submit a new pilot script on Monday morning or the show would not be picked up. Whedon and Tim Minear closeted themselves for the weekend to write what became the new pilot, "The Train Job". At the direction of Fox, they added "larger than life" characters such as the henchman "Crow" and the "hands of blue" men, who also introduced an X-Files-type ending.

For the new pilot, Fox made it clear that they would not air the episodes in widescreen. Whedon and company felt they had to "serve two masters" by filming widescreen for eventual DVD release but keeping objects in-frame so it could still work when aired in pan and scan full frame. To obtain an immersive and immediate feel, the episodes were filmed in a documentary style with hand-held cameras, giving them the look of "found footage", with deliberately mis-framed and out-of-focus subjects. As Whedon related: "don't be arch, don't be sweeping—be found, be rough and tumble and docu[mentary] and you-are-there". Computer-generated scenes mimicked the motion of a hand-held camera; the style was not used when shooting scenes that involved the central government, the Alliance. Tracking and steady cameras were used to show the sterility of this aspect of the Firefly universe. Another style employed was lens flares harking back to 1970s television. This style was so desired that the director of photography, David Boyd, sent back the cutting-edge lenses which reduced lens flare in exchange for cheaper ones. Unlike other science fiction shows which add sound to space scenes for dramatic effect, Firefly portrays space as silent, because sounds cannot be transmitted in the vacuum of space.

Set design 

Production designer Carey Meyer built the ship Serenity in two parts (one for each level) as a complete set with ceilings and practical lighting installed as part of the set that the cameras could use along with moveable parts. The two-part set also allowed the second unit to shoot in one section while the actors and first unit worked undisturbed in the other. As Whedon recalled: "you could pull it away or move something huge so that you could get in and around everything. That meant the environment worked for us and there weren't a lot of adjustments that needed to be made". There were other benefits to this set design. One was that it allowed the viewers to feel they were really in a ship. For Whedon, the design of the ship was crucial in defining the known space for the viewer and that there were not "fourteen hundred decks and a holodeck and an all-you-can-eat buffet in the back." He wanted to convey that it was utilitarian and that it was "beat-up but lived-in. Ultimately, it was home." Each room represented a feeling or character, usually conveyed by the paint color. He explains that as you move from the back of the ship in the engine room, toward the front of the ship to the bridge, the colors and mood progress from extremely warm to cooler. Besides evoking a mood associated with the character who spends the most time in each area, the color scheme also alludes to the heat generated in the ship's tail. Whedon was also keen on using vertical space; having the crew quarters accessible by ladder was important. Another benefit of the set design was that it also allowed the actors to stay in the moment and interact, without having to stop after each shot and set up for the next. This helped contribute to the documentary style Whedon strove for.

The set had several influences, including the sliding doors and tiny cubicles reminiscent of Japanese hotels. Artist Larry Dixon has noted that the cargo bay walls are "reminiscent of interlaced, overlapping Asian designs, cleverly reminding us of the American-Chinese Alliance setting while artistically forming a patterned plane for background scale reference." Dixon has also remarked on how the set design contributed to the storytelling through the use of color, depth, and composition, lighting, as well as its use of diagonals and patterned shadows.

Their small budget was another reason to use the ship for much of the storytelling. When the characters did go off the ship, the worlds all had Earth atmosphere and coloring because they could not afford to design alien worlds. "I didn't want to go to Yucca Flats every other episode and transform it into Bizarro World by making the sky orange", recalled Whedon. As Meyer recalled: "I think in the end the feel was that we wound up using a lot of places or exteriors that just felt too Western and we didn't necessarily want to go that way; but at some point, it just became the lesser of two evils—what could we actually create in three days?"

Music 

Greg Edmonson composed the musical score for the series. He stated that he wrote for the emotion of the moment. A reviewer averred that he also wrote for the characters, stating: "Edmonson has developed a specialized collection of musical symbolism for the series." To help illustrate the collection, the reviewer gave leitmotifs, or "signatures", various names, noting that "Serenity" recalls the theme of the show and is used when they return to the ship, or when they were meeting in secret; it was "the sound of their home". The slide guitar and fiddle used in this piece are portable instruments that fit the lifestyle of the crew: "the music they make calls up tunes played out in the open, by people who were hundreds of miles away yesterday. 'Serenity' conjures the nomadic lifestyle the crew leads and underlines the western aspect of the show." Another emotional signature was "Sad Violin" used at the end of the Battle of Serenity Valley but also to set up the joke when Mal tells Simon that Kaylee is dead in the episode "Serenity". The most memorable use of "Sad Violin" is at the end of "The Message", when the crew mourned the death of Tracey. This was also the last scene of the last episode the actors shot, and so this was seen by them and Edmonson, as Firefly farewell. To denote danger, "Peril" was used, which is "a low pulse, like a heartbeat, with deep chimes and low strings". The reviewer also noted character signatures. The criminal Niska has a signature: Eastern European or Middle Eastern melodies over a low drone. Simon and River's signature was a piano played sparsely with a violin in the background. This contrasts with the portable instruments of "Serenity": the piano is an instrument that cannot be easily moved and evokes the image of "the distant house and family they both long for." The signatures were mostly established in the first pilot, "Serenity", and helped enhance the narrative.

Whedon's use of music in his television shows has been regarded as "filmic", in that he has been argued to use it to remind viewers at "pivotal moments" of earlier events, resulting in a tighter continuity throughout the season.

The musical score expressed the social fusion depicted in the show. Cowboy guitar blended with Asian influence produced the atmospheric background for the series. As one reviewer stated: 

The show's theme song, "The Ballad of Serenity", was written by Joss Whedon and performed by Sonny Rhodes. Whedon wrote the song before the series was greenlit, and a preliminary recording performed by Whedon can be found on the DVD release. The soundtrack to the series was released on CD on November 8, 2005, by Varèse Sarabande. Fox Music released a 40-minute soundtrack in September 2005 as a digital EP. "The Ballad of Serenity" was used by NASA as the wake-up song for astronaut Robert L. Behnken and the other crewmembers of STS-130 on February 12, 2010.

Casting 

In casting his nine-member crew, Whedon looked first at the actors and considered their chemistry with others. Cast member Sean Maher recalls, "So then he just sort of put us all together, and I think it was very quick like right out of the gate, we all instantly bonded." All nine cast members were chosen before filming began; while making the original pilot "Serenity", Whedon decided that Rebecca Gayheart was unsuitable for the role of Inara Serra, and shot her scenes in singles so that it would be easier to replace her. Morena Baccarin auditioned for the role and two days later was on the set in her first television show. "Joss brought me down from the testing room like a proud dad, holding my hand and introducing me", Baccarin recalled.

Whedon approached Nathan Fillion to play the lead role of Malcolm Reynolds; after Whedon explained the premise and showed him the treatment for the pilot, Fillion was eager for the role. Fillion was called back several times to read for the part before he was cast. He noted that "it was really thrilling. It was my first lead, and I was pretty nervous, but I really wanted that part, and I wanted to tell those stories." Fillion later said he was "heartbroken" when he learned the series had been canceled. Fillion has called his time on Firefly the best acting job he ever had, and compares every job he has had to it.

Alan Tudyk applied through a casting office and several months later was called in for an audition, where he met with Whedon. He was called back to test with two candidates for the role of Zoe (Wash's wife) and was told that it was down to him and one other candidate. The Zoes he tested with were not selected (Gina Torres eventually received the role), and Tudyk was sent home but received a call informing him he had the part anyway. His audition tape is included in the special features of the DVD release.

Gina Torres, a veteran of several science fiction/fantasy works (Cleopatra 2525, The Matrix Reloaded, Alias, Hercules: The Legendary Journeys), was at first uninterested in doing another science fiction show but "was won over by the quality of the source material". As she recalled, "you had these challenged characters inhabiting a challenging world, and that makes for great storytelling. And no aliens!"

For Adam Baldwin, who grew up watching westerns, the role of Jayne Cobb was particularly resonant.

Canadian actress Jewel Staite videotaped her audition from Vancouver and was asked to come to Los Angeles to meet Whedon, at which point she was cast for the role of Kaylee Frye, the ship's engineer. She was asked to put on weight for the role.

Sean Maher recalls reading for the part and liking the character of Simon Tam, but that it was Whedon's personality and vision that "sealed the deal" for him. Neil Patrick Harris also read for the part of Simon. For the role of Simon's sister, River Tam, Whedon called in Summer Glau for an audition and test the same day. Glau had first worked for Whedon in the Angel episode "Waiting in the Wings". Two weeks later, Whedon called her to tell her she had the part.

Veteran television actor Ron Glass has said that until Firefly, he had not experienced or sought a science-fiction or western role. Still, he fell in love with the pilot script and the character of Shepherd Book.

Production staff 
Whedon selected Tim Minear to be the show runner, who serves as the head writer and production leader. According to Whedon, "[Minear] understood the show as well as any human being, and just brought so much to it that I think of it as though he were always a part of it." Many of the other production staff were selected from people Whedon had worked with in the past, except the director of photography David Boyd, who was the "big find" and who was "full of joy and energy".

The writers were selected after interviews and script samplings. Among the writers were José Molina, Ben Edlund, Cheryl Cain, Brett Matthews, Drew Z. Greenberg and Jane Espenson. Espenson wrote an essay on the writing process with Mutant Enemy Productions.  A meeting is held and an idea is floated, generally by Whedon, and the writers brainstorm to develop the central theme of the episode and the character development. Next, the writers (except the one working on the previous week's episode) meet in the anteroom to Whedon's office to begin 'breaking' the story into acts and scenes. One of the key components to devising acts for the team is deciding where to break for commercial and ensuring the viewer returns. "Finding these moments in the story help give it shape: think of them as tentpoles that support the structure." For instance, in "Shindig", the break for commercial occurs when Malcolm Reynolds is gravely injured and losing the duel. "It does not end when Mal turns the fight around when he stands victorious over his opponent. They're both big moments, but one of them leaves you curious, and the other doesn't."

Next, the writers develop the scenes onto a marker-filled whiteboard, featuring "a brief ordered description of each scene". A writer is selected to create an outline of the episode's concept—occasionally with some dialogue and jokes—in one day. The outline is given to showrunner Tim Minear, who revises it within a day. The writer uses the revised outline to write the first draft of the script while the other writers develop the next. This first draft is usually submitted for revision within three to fourteen days; afterward, a second and sometimes third draft is written. After all modifications are made, the final draft would be produced as the "shooting draft".

Costume 
Jill Ohanneson, Fireflys original costume designer, brought on Shawna Trpcic as her assistant for the pilot. When the show was picked up, Ohanneson was involved in another job and declined Firefly, suggesting Trpcic for the job.

The costumes were chiefly influenced by World War II, the American Civil War, the American Old West, and 1861 samurai Japan. Trpcic used deep reds and oranges for the main cast to express a feeling of "home" and contrasted that with grays and cool blues for the Alliance. Since the characters were often getting shot, Trpcic would make up to six versions of the same costume for multiple takes.
 For River, mostly jewel tones were used to set her apart from the rest of the Serenity crew. River had boots to contrast with the soft fabrics of her clothes, "because that's who she is—she's this soft, beautiful, sensitive girl, but with this hardcore inner character", recalled Trpcic.
 The designers also wanted to contrast Simon, River's brother, with the rest of the crew. Whereas they were dressed in cotton, Simon wore wool, stiff fabrics, satins, and silk. He was originally the "dandy", but as the show progressed, he loosened up slightly.
 For Kaylee, Trpcic studied Japanese and Chinese youth, as originally the character was Asian. Other inspirations for Kaylee's costumes were Rosie the Riveter and Chinese Communist posters.
 Inara's costumes reflect her high status and are very feminine and attractive.
 Trpcic designed and created the clothes for the minor character of Badger with Joss Whedon in mind since he intended to play that part. When Mark Sheppard played the role instead, he could fit into the clothes made for Whedon.
 For the Alliance, besides the grays and cool blues, Trpcic had in mind Nazi Germany, but mixed it with different wars, as the first sketches were "too Nazi". The uniforms of the Alliance soldiers are from the 1997 film Starship Troopers.
 In the commentary for the pilot episode, Whedon points out that "bad guys wear hats, good guys don't."

Unproduced episodes 
Since the cancellation of the series, various cast and crew members have revealed details they had planned for the show's future:
 Alan Tudyk had the idea for an episode about a planet that is always day on one side and night on the other. On the night side, Jayne accidentally spills a type of pheromone on himself and the crew, which attracts many dogs. The crew is chased back to the ship by these dogs. There River uses her mind powers to domesticate the dogs.
 Adam Baldwin wanted to make an episode in which Jayne goes up against Mal as captain of his ship.
 Tim Minear revealed the secret of Inara's syringe, as seen in the pilot episode; she is infected with a deadly disease. There would have been an episode where Reavers gang-rape her. Because she injected herself with the syringe, all of the Reavers on the ship die.
 According to Nathan Fillion, there was an episode in which the crew land on a dying planet. The inhabitants try to steal Serenity after explaining to the crew about their need to get off the planet. The problem is that unless they were to run into another ship along the way, with the extra passengers, Serenity would not have enough fuel and oxygen to make it to the closest destination. While everyone else is asleep, Mal takes the ship himself and discovers that help would never have arrived.

Broadcast history 
Firefly consists of a two-hour pilot and thirteen one-hour episodes (with commercials). The series originally premiered in the United States on Fox in September 2002. The episodes were aired out of the intended order. Although Whedon had designed the show to run for seven years, low ratings resulted in cancellation by Fox in December 2002 after only 11 of the 14 completed episodes aired in the United States. The three episodes unaired by Fox eventually debuted in 2003 on the Sci Fi Channel in the United Kingdom. Prior to cancellation, some fans, worried about low ratings, formed the Firefly Immediate Assistance campaign whose goal was to support the production of the show by sending in postcards to Fox. After it was canceled, the campaign worked on getting another network such as UPN to pick up the series. The campaign was unsuccessful in securing the show's continuation.

The A.V. Club cited several actions by the Fox network that contributed to the show's failure, most notably airing the episodes out of sequence, making the plot more difficult to follow. For instance, the double episode "Serenity" was intended as the premiere, and therefore contained most of the character introductions and back-story. Fox decided that "Serenity" was unsuitable for opening the series, and "The Train Job" was specifically created to act as a new pilot. In addition, Firefly was promoted as an action-comedy rather than the more serious character study it was intended to be, and the showbiz trade paper Variety noted Fox's decision to occasionally preempt the show for sporting events.

Fox remastered the complete series in 1080i high-definition for broadcast on Universal HD, which began in April 2008.

On March 12, 2009, the series was the winner of the first annual Hulu awards in the category "Shows We'd Bring Back".

The Science Channel began airing the series on March 6, 2011. All episodes aired in the intended order, including episodes "Trash", "The Message" and "Heart of Gold", which were not aired in the original Fox series run. Along with each episode, Dr. Michio Kaku provided commentary about the real-life science behind the show's science fiction.

Home media releases 
A box set containing the 14 completed episodes (including those which had not yet aired in the United States) was released on region 1 DVD on December 9, 2003, region 2 on April 19, 2004, and region 4 on August 2, 2004. The box features the episodes in the original order in which the show's producers had intended them to be broadcast, as well as seven episode commentaries, outtakes and other features. The DVDs feature the episodes as they were shot in 16:9 widescreen, with anamorphic transfers and Dolby Surround audio. By September 2005, its DVD release had sold about 500,000 copies.

The series was re-released on Blu-ray Disc on November 11, 2008, comprising three discs; exclusive extras to the Blu-ray release include extra audio commentary from Joss Whedon, Nathan Fillion, Alan Tudyk and Ron Glass for the episode "Our Mrs. Reynolds", as well as an additional featurette, "Firefly" Reunion: Lunch with Joss, Nathan, Alan and Ron. On September 19, 2017, the series was reissued on Blu-ray as a 15th Anniversary Collection. The set included new packaging that came with character cards and a fold-out map of the solar system in which the series is set.

Reception

Critical response 
On Rotten Tomatoes, the series has an approval rating of 77% with an average score of 7.8 out of 10 based on 44 reviews. The website's critical consensus reads, "Firefly earns its audience's adoration with the help of Nathan Fillion's dry delivery, a detailed fantasy world, and compelling storylines – even if it doesn't stand with creator Joss Whedon's most consistent work." Metacritic collected 30 reviews and calculated an average score of 63 out of 100, indicating "generally favorable reviews".

Many reviews focused on the show's fusion of Wild West and outer space motifs. TV Guides Matt Roush, for instance, called the show "oddball" and "offbeat" and noted how the series took the metaphor of space operas as Westerns. Roush opined that the shift from space travel to horseback was "jarring", but that once he got used to this, he found the characters cleverly conceived and the writing a crisp balance of action, tension, and humor. Several reviewers, criticized the show's setting; Tim Goodman of the San Francisco Chronicle felt that the melding of the western and science fiction genres was a "forced hodgepodge of two alarmingly opposite genres just for the sake of being different" and called the series a "vast disappointment", and Carina Chocano of Salon.com said that while the "space as Wild West" metaphor is fairly redundant, neither genre connected to the present. Emily Nussbaum of The New York Times, reviewing the DVD set, noted that the program featured "an oddball genre mix that might have doomed it from the beginning: it was a character-rich sci-fi western comedy-drama with existential underpinnings, a hard sell during a season dominated by Joe Millionaire".

The Boston Globe described Firefly as a "wonderful, imaginative mess brimming with possibility". The review further notes the difference between the new series and other programs was that those shows "burst onto the scene with slick pilots and quickly deteriorate into mediocrity ... Firefly is on the opposite creative journey." Jason Snell called the show one of the best on television, and one "with the most potential for future brilliance".

Tim White, writing for The Objective Standard, focused his review on the show's depiction of heroism. He concludes that "Firefly is not perfectly accurate in its attempts to depict the essential natures of heroism and villainy, but its successes are much more uplifting than its failures are problematic. It's also consistently funny, skillfully written, and passionately acted."

Reviewers also compared Firefly to Whedon's other series, Buffy the Vampire Slayer. Chocano noted that the series lacks the psychological tension of Buffy and suggests that this might be attributable to the episodes being aired out of order. MSN, on the other hand, pointed out that after viewing the DVD boxed set, it was easy to see why the program had attracted many die-hard fans. "All of Whedon's fingerprints are there: the witty dialogue, the quirky premises and dark exploration of human fallacy that made Buffy brilliant found their way to this space drama".

Princess Weekes from The Mary Sue stated that she "really enjoyed" the series, but wrote that, "it lacks Chinese actors, so if it's going to be brought back, that's a really easy fix." Writing for Syfy, Alyssa Fikse described the show as a "problematic fave", calling the lack of Asian characters in the show "negligent at best, racist at worst".

Fandom 

Firefly generated a loyal base of fans during its three-month original broadcast run on Fox in late 2002. These fans, self-styled Browncoats, used online forums to organize and try to save the series from being canceled by Fox only three months after its debut. Their efforts included raising money for an ad in Variety magazine and a postcard writing campaign to UPN.  While unsuccessful in finding a network that would continue the show, their support led to a release of the series on DVD in December 2003. A subsequent fan campaign raised over $14,000 in donations to have a purchased Firefly DVD set placed aboard 250 U.S. Navy ships by April 2004 for recreational viewing by their crews.

These and other continuing fan activities eventually persuaded Universal Studios to produce a feature film, Serenity. (The title of Serenity was chosen, according to Whedon, because Fox still owned the rights to the name 'Firefly'). Numerous early screenings of rough film cuts were held for existing fans starting in May 2005 as an attempt to create a buzz to increase ticket sales when the final film cut was released widely on September 30, 2005. The film was not as commercially successful as fans had hoped, opening at number two and making only $40 million worldwide during its initial theatrical release.

On June 23, 2006, fans organized the first worldwide charity screenings of Serenity in 47 cities, dubbed as Can't Stop the Serenity or CSTS, an homage to the movie's tagline, "Can't stop the signal".  The event raised over $65,000 for Whedon's favorite charity, Equality Now. In 2007, $106,000 was raised; in 2008, $107,219; and in 2009, $137,331.

In July 2006, a fan-made documentary was released, titled Done the Impossible, and is commercially available. The documentary relates the story of the fans and how the show has affected them, and features interviews with Whedon and various cast members. Part of the DVD proceeds are donated to Equality Now.

NASA Browncoat astronaut Steven Swanson took the Firefly and Serenity DVDs with him on Space Shuttle Atlantis's STS-117 mission in June 2007. The DVDs were added to the media collection on the International Space Station as entertainment for the station's crews.

A fan-made, not-for-profit, unofficial sequel to Serenity, titled Browncoats: Redemption, premiered at Dragon*Con 2010 on September 4, 2010. According to the film's creator and producer, Whedon gave "his blessing" to the project. The film was sold on DVD and Blu-ray at the film's website, with all proceeds being distributed among five charities. The film was also screened at various science-fiction conventions across the United States, with admission receipts similarly being donated. All sales ended on September 1, 2011, one year after its premiere, with total revenues exceeding $115,000.

Cult status 
In 2005, New Scientist magazine's website held an internet poll to find "The World's Best Space Sci-Fi Ever". Firefly came in first place, with its cinematic follow-up Serenity in second. In 2012, Entertainment Weekly listed the show at No. 11 in the "25 Best Cult TV Shows from the Past 25 Years", commenting, "as it often does, martyrdom has only enhanced its legend."

Brad Wright, co-creator of Stargate SG-1 has said that the 200th episode of SG-1 is "a little kiss to Serenity and Firefly, which was possibly one of the best canceled series in history". In the episode, "Martin Lloyd has come to the S.G.C. [Stargate Command] because even though 'Wormhole X-Treme!' was canceled after three episodes, it did so well on DVD they're making a feature [film]".

The follow-up film, Serenity, was voted the best science fiction movie of all time in an SFX magazine poll of 3,000 fans.  Firefly was later ranked #25 on TV Guides Top Cult Shows Ever.  The name for the Google beta app Google Wave was inspired by this TV series.

In an interview on February 17, 2011, with Entertainment Weekly, Nathan Fillion joked that: "If I got $300 million from the California Lottery, the first thing I would do is buy the rights to Firefly, make it on my own, and distribute it on the Internet".  This quickly gave rise to a fan-run initiative to raising the funds to purchase the rights. On March 7, 2011, the organizers announced the closure of the project due to lack of endorsement from the creators, with $1 million pledged at the time it was shut down.

Joss Whedon, Tim Minear, and cast members Nathan Fillion, Alan Tudyk, Summer Glau, Adam Baldwin, and Sean Maher reunited at the 2012 San Diego Comic-Con for a 10th-anniversary panel. Ten thousand people lined up to get into the panel, and the panel ended with the entire crowd giving the cast and crew a standing ovation.

A tenth anniversary special, Browncoats Unite, was shown on the Science Channel on November 11, 2012. The special featured Whedon, Minear, and several of the cast members, in a discussion on the series' history.

According to Reasons Julian Sanchez, Fireflys cult following "seems to include a disproportionate number of libertarians".  The story themes are often cautionary about too-powerful central authority and its capacity to do bad while being considered by the majority as good. The characters each exhibit traits that exemplify core libertarian values, such as the right to bear arms (Jayne, Zoe), legal prostitution (Inara), freedom of religion (Book), logic and reasoning (Simon), and anti-conscription (River).  Joss Whedon notes this theme, saying "Mal is, if not a Republican, certainly a libertarian, he's certainly a less-government kinda guy. He's the opposite of me in many ways."

Podcasts 
The Signal is a Firefly and Serenity-focused podcast developed by fans of the Joss Whedon property. Hosted by Kari Haley and Les Howard, The Signal is a fan-driven podcast dedicated to Joss Whedon's short-lived TV series Firefly (2002) and its film Serenity (2005).  Initially created as guerrilla marketing to promote Serenity, the podcast features discussions about the franchise's role-playing game, fan fiction as audio dramas, and interviews (e.g. with PJ Haarsma, Jane Espenson, and Marc Gunn).  Haley and Howard described the podcast's purpose as "[doing] whatever we can to see that more new Firefly is created in any format."

In early 2006, Mur Lafferty described the show as "PG-rated", about an hour long, and publishing an episode every two weeks.  That December, The Signal released a compilation album of filk music that had previously featured on the podcast: Songs from the Black; the album featured music by Luke Ski, Lich King, and Greg Edmonson.

In 2006, The Signal received a People's Choice Podcast Award in the categories of "TV & Film" and "Best Produced"; it received the former again in 2008.  The Signal was awarded the 2007 Parsec Award for "Best Fan Podcast", and in the category of "Best Speculative Fiction Fan or News Podcast (Specific)", it won the 2010 and 2012 Parsecs. Writing for Maximum Fun, Ian Brill praised The Signal as surprisingly professional with well-produced segments, though he unflatteringly compared Haley and Howard to Whedon's character Xander Harris: "They say mildly clever and cutesy things to each other and then sound tremendously satisfied with themselves while saying it."

Awards 
Firefly won the following awards:
 Emmy Award: Outstanding Special Visual Effects for a Series, 2003
 Visual Effects Society: Best visual effects in a television series, 2003 (episode "Serenity")
 Saturn Award: Cinescape Genre Face of the Future Award, Male, 2003 (Nathan Fillion)
 Saturn Award: Saturn Award for Best DVD Release (television), 2004
 SyFy Genre Awards: Best Series/Television, 2006
 SyFy Genre Awards: Best Actor/Television Nathan Fillion, 2006
 SyFy Genre Awards: Best Supporting Actor/Television Adam Baldwin, 2006
 SyFy Genre Awards: Best Special Guest/Television Christina Hendricks for "Trash", 2006
 SyFy Genre Awards: Best Episode/Television "Trash", 2006

The series was also nominated for the following awards:
 Visual Effects Society: Best compositing in a televised program, music video, or commercial, 2003
 Motion Picture Sound Editors, USA, "Golden Reel Award": Best sound editing in television long form: sound effects/foley, 2003
 Hugo Award: Best Dramatic Presentation, Short Form, 2003 (episode "Serenity")
 Hugo Award: Best Dramatic Presentation, Short Form, 2004 (episodes "Heart of Gold" and "The Message", which at that time had not been shown on television in the USA)
 Golden Satellite Award: Best DVD Extras, 2004

Ratings 
At the time the series was canceled by Fox, it averaged 4.7 million viewers and ranked 98th in Nielsen ratings.

In popular culture 

The cancellation of Firefly is a running gag in the CBS sitcom, The Big Bang Theory, which ran from 2007–2019. The character Sheldon Cooper is a fan of the show. When he and Leonard Hofstadter discuss their roommate agreement, they include a passage in which they dedicate Friday nights to watching Firefly, as Sheldon believes it will last for years. Upon its cancellation, he brands Rupert Murdoch, the owner of Fox, a traitor. During the show's second season, in episode 17 ("The Terminator Decoupling"), Summer Glau appears as herself, encountering Sheldon, Leonard, and their friends on a train to San Francisco. When Raj tries to hit on her, he says that although he is an astrophysicist, she was actually in space during the shooting of Firefly. Glau chides him for believing this, and Raj backtracks, saying, "Those are crazy people!" In season 8, episode 15, Raj and Leonard recognize Nathan Fillion in a café and insist on taking a selfie with him, though he denies being the Firefly star. 

On the NBC comedy Community, the characters Troy and Abed are fans of the show. They have an agreement that if one of them dies, the other will stage it to look like a suicide caused by the cancellation of Firefly, in the hopes that it will bring the show back.

In the 2003 Battlestar Galactica miniseries/pilot, a ship resembling Serenity appears in the background of the scene with Laura Roslin (Mary McDonnell). Serenity is one of several spaceships inserted as cameos into digital effects scenes by Zoic Studios, the company responsible for digital effects in both Firefly and Battlestar Galactica.

The webcomic xkcd commented on Fireflys conspicuous absence of Asian characters in the 2009 comic "Well". When a character drops a coin into "The Uncomfortable Truths Well", it responds, "For a universe that's supposed to be half Chinese, Firefly sure doesn't have any Asians."

Critics have drawn comparisons and parallels between Firefly and the anime Outlaw Star.

The television series Castle, where Fillion plays the lead character Richard Castle, has made ongoing homages to Firefly. Castle has props from Firefly as decorative items in his home, has dressed up as a "space cowboy" for Halloween ("You wore that five years ago", cracked his daughter), speaks Chinese that he learned from "a TV show [he] loved", and has made rapid "two-by-two" finger motions while wearing blue surgical gloves. He has been humorously asked if he has ever heard of a spa known as "Serenity", and Firefly catchphrases such as "shiny", "special hell", and "I was aiming for the head" have been used as punchlines during various dramatic scenes in Castle. He has worked a murder case at a science fiction convention with suspects being the cast of a long-cancelled space opera that only ran for a season, and has had direct and incidental interaction with people portrayed by Firefly cast members.

Con Man, a 2015 comedy web series created by Tudyk and co-produced by Fillion, draws on the pair's experiences as cult science fiction actors touring the convention circuit. Though it is not autobiographical, the show's fictional Spectrum echoes Firefly and Tudyk's and Fillion's roles reflect their own Firefly roles. Staite, Torres, Glau, Maher, and Whedon made guest appearances. Maher played himself as a former Firefly actor.

Media franchise 

The popularity of the short-lived series served as the launching point for a media franchise within the Firefly universe, including the feature film Serenity, which addresses many plot points left unresolved by the series' cancellation.

Additionally, there are two comic-book mini-series, Serenity: Those Left Behind (3 issues, 104 pages, 2006), Serenity: Better Days (3 issues, 80 pages, 2008) and a one-shot hardcover Serenity: The Shepherd's Tale (56 pages, 2010), along with the one-shots Serenity: Downtime and The Other Half and Serenity: Float Out in which Whedon explored plot strands he had intended to explore further in the series. The comics are set, in plot terms, between the end of the TV series and the opening of the feature film. The two mini-series were later published in collected form as hardcover and paperback graphic novels. A six-issue series titled Serenity: Leaves on the Wind began in January 2014 and the series takes place after the events of the film. A six-issue series titled Serenity: No Power in the 'Verse began in October 2016 and the series is set about 1.5 years after Leaves on the Wind. In July 2018, Boom! Studios announced that they had acquired the comic book and graphic novel publishing license to Firefly with plans to release new monthly comic book series, limited series, original graphic novels, and more.

In July 2014, the release of the video game Firefly Online was announced that planned to have the cast reprise their roles. Although never officially cancelled, there have been no updates about the game's release since March 2016.

In January 2018, Titan Books announced that they would begin publishing original canon Firefly novels. Seven books have so far been released.

References

Further reading

External links 

 
 
 Firefly-Serenity Chinese Pinyinary—English translations of the Chinese words and phrases used in Firefly and Serenity

 
2002 American television series debuts
2002 American television series endings
Television series set in the 26th century
2000s American science fiction television series
English-language television shows
Fox Broadcasting Company original programming
Libertarian science fiction
Saturn Award-winning television series
Space adventure television series
Space Western television series
Television series by 20th Century Fox Television
Television series created by Joss Whedon
Television series set on fictional planets
Television shows filmed in Los Angeles
Television series set in the future
Television shows adapted into comics